Nileidae is a family of trilobites of the Asaphida order.

These fast-moving nektonic carnivores lived in the Ordovician and Cambrian periods.

Genera
Aocaspis Dolambi and Gond 1992
Barrandia McCoy 1849
Borthaspidella Rasetti 1954
Homalopteon Salter 1867
Illaenopsis Salter 1865
Kodymaspis Prantl and Pribyl 1950
Neopsilocephalina Yin 1978
Nileus Dalman 1827
Parabarrandia Prantl and Pribyl 1949
Peraspis Whittington 1965
Petrbokia Pribyl and Vanek 1965
Platypeltoides Pribyl 1949
Poronileus Fortey 1975
Psilocephalinella Kobayashi 1951
Symphysurina Ulrich 1924
Symphysurus Goldfuss 1843
Varvia Thernvik 1965

References

 
Cyclopygoidea
Trilobite families
Cambrian first appearances
Ordovician extinctions